The Soltan Mosque (Cyrillic: Солтан мәчете; formerly Cihanşa bay Mosque, The Red Mosque, Ğosman Mosque, The Eighth Mosque, also spelled Sultan or Sultanovskaya via Russian Султановская мечеть) is a mosque in Kazan, Russia.

History
It was built in 1868 on the donation of merchant Cihanşa Ğosmanov. The mosque is built in traditions of the Tatar-Bolghar medieval architecture combined with national romance style. There is one hall with entresol. The three-storied minaret is placed over the entry. In 1931 the mosque was closed by the Soviet authorities. In 1990 the minaret was restored, in 1994 the mosque was returned to believers.

Gallery

See also
Islam in Tatarstan
Islam in Russia
List of mosques in Russia
List of mosques in Europe
Sultan Mosque in Singapore

References
 

Mosques in Kazan
Closed mosques in the Soviet Union
Mosques in Russia
Mosques in Europe
Mosques completed in 1868
Cultural heritage monuments of regional significance in Tatarstan